Communauté d'agglomération du Pays Ajaccien is the communauté d'agglomération, an intercommunal structure, centred on the city of Ajaccio. It is located in the Corse-du-Sud department, in the Corsica region, southeastern France. Created in 2001, its seat is in Ajaccio. Its area is 268.8 km2. Its population was 88,483 in 2019, of which 71,361 in Ajaccio proper.

Composition
The communauté d'agglomération consists of the following 10 communes:

Afa
Ajaccio
Alata
Appietto
Cuttoli-Corticchiato
Peri
Sarrola-Carcopino
Tavaco
Valle-di-Mezzana
Villanova

References

Ajaccien
Ajaccien